Motor vehicle theft (also known as a car theft and, in the United States, grand theft auto) is the criminal act of stealing or attempting to steal a motor vehicle. Nationwide in the United States in 2020, there were 810,400 vehicles reported stolen, up from 724,872 in 2019. Property losses due to motor vehicle theft in 2020 were estimated at $7.4 billion. There were 505,100 car thefts in the EU in 2019, a 43% decrease from 2008.

Methods

Some methods used by criminals to steal motor vehicles:
 Theft of an unattended vehicle without a key: the removal of a parked vehicle either by breaking and entry, followed by hotwiring or other tampering methods to start the vehicle, or else towing. In London, the police say that 50% of the annual 20,000 car thefts are now from high-tech OBD (Onboard Diagnostic Port) key-cloning kits (available online) and bypass immobilizer simulators.
 Taking without owner's consent (TWOC): the unauthorized use of a car short of theft. This term is used in the United Kingdom, as is the derivative "twocking".
 Opportunistic theft: either the removal of a vehicle that is unattended with the keys visible and sometimes the engine idling, or theft of a vehicle offered for sale during what the thief represents as a test drive. A "test drive" may also give a potential thief insight into where the vehicle keys are stored, so that the thief may return later to steal the vehicle.
 Carjacking: taking a vehicle by force, or threat of force, against its owner or operator. In most places, this is the most serious form of vehicle theft, because assault also occurs and the method of taking over the vehicle is essentially a robbery, a more serious form of theft. In some carjackings, the operators and passengers are forced from the vehicle while the thief is driving it. In other incidents, the operator and/or passenger(s) are held hostage in it. In still others, which are less common, the assailant forces the lawful operator to drive in accordance with the demands of the assailant, who rides as a passenger.
 Fraudulent theft: illegal acquisition of a vehicle from a seller through fraudulent transfer of funds that the seller will ultimately not receive (such as by identity theft or counterfeiting a cashier's check), or through the use of a loan obtained under false pretenses. Many vehicles stolen via fraud are soon resold, by the thieves. Using this approach, the thief can quietly evade detection and continue stealing vehicles in different jurisdictions. Car rental companies and car dealerships are also defrauded by car thieves into renting, selling, financing, or leasing them cars with fake identification, checks, and credit cards.  This is a common practice near national borders, where tracking devices are less effective because the victims may lack jurisdiction in the countries into which the vehicles quickly are removed.
 Frosting: Occurring in winter, which involves an opportunist thief stealing a vehicle with its engine running whilst the owner de-ices it.
 "Hanoi burglary", where a vehicle is taken during a house burglary, often done with the explicit purpose of obtaining car keys. Named after the first police operation targeting the method.
 Joyriding: refers to driving or riding in a stolen vehicle, most commonly a car, with no particular goal other than the pleasure or thrill of doing so.
Keyless system theft: The risk of cars with keyless entry being stolen is high. These are cars where the owner does not have to even press a button to unlock as long as the key is located at a certain distance from the vehicle. In theory, the key's signal should no longer reach the car when the driver moves away, making it impossible to unlock the car. Car thieves extend the signal from the owner's key with the help of simple signal amplifiers. and then all they have to do is open the door, hit the start button and drive away unnoticed. The car's alarm system is totally blind to this.

Auto-theft tools and paraphernalia
 A thin metal strap or rod that slips inside a door's cavity at the base of the window, to manipulate an internal locking mechanism or linkage. A famously known tool is called the "slim jim".
 A long rod with a hooked end that slips between door and frame, or through an opened window, that can reach and manipulate the door handle or lock from inside the vehicle cab.  (A primary technique used professionally.)
 Broken pieces of ceramic, often from a spark plug insulator, used for throwing at car door windows so they shatter quietly.
 Specially cut or filed-down car keys, numerous tryout keys, jigglers and other lock picking tools.
 Slide hammer puller to break apart door locks, steering-wheel locks, and ignition switch locks by forced removal of the cylinder core.
 Multimeter or electrician's test lamp to locate a power source, for disabling alarms and jump starting vehicles.
 Spare wires and/or a screwdriver to connect a power source to the ignition and starter wires.
 Unusual looking electronics gear that may include; laptop or tablet, radio antennas, cables, battery packs, and other modified computer components that look homemade.
 Many keyless ignition/lock cars have weak cryptographic protection of their unlock radio signal or are susceptible to some form of record-and-playback or range extending attack. While proof-of-concept "thefts" of top-of-the-line luxury cars have been demonstrated by academic researchers using commercially available tools, such as RFID microreaders, examples of actual car theft using these methods are not very prevalent.
 A firearm, knife or other weapon used to break a window.
 OBD key cloning kit.

Vehicles most frequently stolen

The makes and models of vehicles most frequently stolen vary by several factors, including region and ease of theft. In particular, the security systems in older vehicles may not be up to the same standard as current vehicles, and thieves also have longer to learn their weaknesses.  Scrap metal and spare part prices may also influence thieves to prefer older vehicles.

In Bangkok, Thailand, the most frequently stolen vehicles are Toyota cars, Toyota Hilux and Isuzu D-Max pickups.

In Malaysia, Proton models are the most frequently stolen vehicles, with the Proton Wira being the highest, followed by the Proton Waja and the Proton Perdana.

In Indonesia, locally-produced MPVs such as Toyota Avanza, Daihatsu Xenia and Suzuki Ertiga are the most commonly stolen vehicles.

In the United Kingdom, the Mercedes-Benz C-Class was the most stolen car in 2018, followed by the BMW X5. Police said the growing number of vehicles featuring keyless entry technology was a contributing factor to a rising number of stolen vehicles.

In the United States and Australia, a design flaw allowing USB cables to substitute for car keys led to sharp increases in the thefts of affected Kia and Hyundai vehicles in 2022.
The Dodge Challenger and Dodge Charger are listed as the most stolen vehicles in the United States (especially Hellcat powered)

Prevention

There are various methods of prevention to reduce the likelihood of a vehicle getting stolen. These include physical barriers, which make the effort of stealing the vehicle more difficult. Some of these include:
 Devices used to lock a part of the vehicle necessary in its operation, such as the wheel, steering wheel, or brake pedal. A commonly used device of this kind is the steering-wheel lock (also known as a crook lock or club lock).
 Immobilisers allow the vehicle to start only if a key containing the correct chip is present in the ignition. These work by locking the steering wheel and disabling the ignition.
 Hidden kill switches cut electric current to the ignition coil, fuel pump, or other system to frustrate or slow down a thief.
 Deterrents tell the thief they are more likely to get caught if the vehicle is stolen. These include:
 Car alarm systems are triggered by breaking and entry into the vehicle.
 Microdot identification tags allow individual parts of a vehicle to be identified.
 Signs on windows warning of other deterrents, sometimes as a bluff.
 VIN etching may reduce the resale value of parts or increase risk of resale.

Recovery of stolen vehicles

Recovery rates for stolen vehicles vary, depending on the effort a jurisdiction's police department puts into recovery, and devices a vehicle has installed to assist in the process.

Police departments use various methods of recovering stolen vehicles, such as random checks of vehicles that come in front of a patrol unit, checks of all vehicles parked along a street or within a parking lot using automatic number plate recognition (ANPR) or keeping a watchlist of all the vehicles reported stolen by their owners. Police departments also receive tips on the location of stolen vehicles through StolenCar.com or isitnicked.com in the United Kingdom.

In the UK, the Driver and Vehicle Licensing Agency (DVLA) provides information on the registration of vehicles to certain companies for consumer protection and anti-fraud purposes. The information may be added by companies with details from the police, finance and insurance companies. Such companies include Carfax in the US, AutoCheck and CarCheck in the United Kingdom, Gapless in Germany and Cartell in Ireland, VinCheckFree Worldwide which then provide online car check services for the public and motor trade.

Vehicle tracking systems, such as LoJack, automatic vehicle location, or OnStar, may enable the location of the vehicle to be tracked by local law enforcement or a private company. Other security devices such as microdot identification allow individual parts of a vehicle to also be identified and potentially returned.

Statistics

Motor vehicle thefts, by country 
Criminologist Frank E. Hagan wrote that, "Probably the most important factor in the rate of motor vehicle theft is the number of motor vehicles per capita in the country." Using data supplied by the United Nations Office on Drugs and Crime, the estimated worldwide auto-theft rate is 85.3 per 100,000 residents. However, data is not available for all countries, and this crime rate reflects only the most recent year (2018) of reported data. For the 2,302,190,898 people these countries represent, there were a total 1,963,007 cars stolen. New Zealand has the highest auto-theft rate for any fairly large country in the world, at 1172.0 per 100,000 residents in 2018. However Bermuda in its most recent year of reported auto-thefts (2016), reported a rate of 1215.3 per 100,000 people. But the population of Bermuda (63,360) is smaller than many cities in countries such as the US and Canada. Some cities have higher rates than Bermuda, such as Richmond, California, which had an auto-theft rate of 1,518.3 in 2018.

The United Nations Office on Drugs and Crime notes "that when using the figures, any cross-national comparisons should be conducted with caution because of the differences that exist between the legal definitions of offenses in countries, or the different methods of offense counting and recording".  Crime rates in certain neighborhoods or areas in each country may also be higher or lower than the nationwide rate.  Furthermore, because the vehicle theft rates shown in the table below are "per 100,000 population"—not per 100,000 vehicles—countries with low vehicle ownership rates will appear to have lower theft rates even if the theft rate per vehicle is relatively high.

See also 
 Containerization § Hazards

References

External links

 
Crimes
Property crimes
Vehicle security systems